The Prime Minister of Adygea is the most senior official within the State Assembly of the Republic of Adygea, Russia. Since the dissolution of the Soviet Union, twelve people have served as Prime Ministers.

References
Russian Administrative divisions

Politics of the Republic of Adygea